The 2019 Bangkok Challenger was a professional tennis tournament played on hard courts. It was the eleventh edition of the tournament and was part of the 2019 ATP Challenger Tour. It took place in Bangkok, Thailand between 11 and 17 February 2019.

Singles main-draw entrants

Seeds

 1 Rankings are as of 4 February 2019.

Other entrants
The following players received wildcards into the singles main draw:
  Palaphoom Kovapitukted
  Natthasith Kunsuwan
  Janko Tipsarević
  Wishaya Trongcharoenchaikul
  Pol Wattanakul

The following player received entry into the singles main draw as an alternate:
  Denis Yevseyev

The following players received entry into the singles main draw using their ITF World Tennis Ranking:
  Dimitar Kuzmanov
  Ivan Nedelko
  David Pérez Sanz
  Oriol Roca Batalla

The following players received entry from the qualifying draw:
  Ivan Gakhov
  Evgenii Tiurnev

Champions

Singles

 Henri Laaksonen def.  Dudi Sela 6–2, 6–4.

Doubles

 Gong Maoxin /  Zhang Ze def.  Hsieh Cheng-peng /  Christopher Rungkat 6–4, 6–4.

 
 ATP Challenger Tour
Tennis, ATP Challenger Tour, Bangkok Challenger
Tennis, ATP Challenger Tour, Bangkok Challenger

Tennis, ATP Challenger Tour, Bangkok Challenger